Caterina Cornaro ossia La Regina di Cipro (Caterina Cornaro or The Queen of Cyprus)  is a tragedia lirica, or opera, in a prologue and two acts by Gaetano Donizetti.  wrote the Italian libretto after Jules-Henri Vernoy de Saint-Georges' libretto for Halévy's La reine de Chypre (1841). It is based on the life of Caterina Cornaro (1454 - 1510), Queen of Cyprus from 1474 to 1489. It premiered at the Teatro San Carlo, Naples on 12 January 1844.

Composition history
Following the success of Linda di Chamounix, Caterina Cornaro was commissioned by Bartolomeo Merelli, impresario of the Kaertnerthortheater in Vienna, and was partly composed in 1842, just before Don Pasquale, and completed during the following summer. The Viennese realised that the same subject had been set to music the preceding year by Franz Lachner and the debut was cancelled. Donizetti dedicated himself instead to Maria di Rohan, presented at the Theater am Kärntnertor in June 1843, and searched for a suitable theatre for Caterina. Two months after the triumph of Dom Sébastien in Paris, Caterina was booed at the San Carlo in Naples. The composer, who had been unable to be present at rehearsals or to oversee the orchestration, had clearly predicted the opera's failure, in a January 1844 communication to his brother-in-law:

I am anxiously awaiting news of the fiasco of Caterina Cornaro in Naples. La Goldberg as a primadonna is my first disaster without knowing it. I wrote for a soprano, they give me a mezzo! God knows if Coletti,  if Fraschini intend their roles as I intend them. God knows what a catastrophe censorship has brought.

In the winter of 1844–45, Donizetti devoted himself to a revision which provided a different ending. The new version was presented in Parma in February 1845, with Marianna Barbieri-Nini in the title role.  It was the last of Donizetti's operas to have its première during his lifetime.

Performance history
A contemporary revival took place at the Teatro San Carlo, Naples in 1972, with Leyla Gencer, Renato Bruson and Giacomo Aragall. Gencer sang a concert version the following year at Carnegie Hall, New York. In the same year, Montserrat Caballé sang Caterina in Paris at the Salle Pleyel and followed it with concert performances in London, Barcelona and Nice, some of which have been preserved on record.

Winton Dean has noted how the tenor role in Caterina Cornaro is marginalized compared to the conventions of Italian opera of the day.  Dean also commented on the particularly menacing quality of the assassins' chorus in the opera.

Roles

Synopsis 
Place: Venice and Cyprus
Time: 1472

The wedding of Caterina, daughter of Andrea Cornaro, to a young Frenchman, Gerardo, is postponed when Mocenigo brings word that Lusignano, King of Cyprus, wishes to marry her. After much intrigue, involving Lusignano being slowly poisoned by Mocenigo, Gerardo joins the Knights of the Cross to help Lusignano defend Cyprus against the Venetians. Lusignano is mortally wounded; as he dies he entrusts his people to Caterina's care. Gerardo then returns to Rhodes. (In the revised finale for the Parma production, Lusignano informs Caterina that Gerardo has been killed in battle.)

Recordings

References
Notes

Sources

Allitt, John Stewart (1991), Donizetti: in the light of Romanticism and the teaching of Johann Simon Mayr, Shaftesbury: Element Books, Ltd (UK); Rockport, MA: Element, Inc.(USA)
Ashbrook, William (1982), Donizetti and His Operas, Cambridge University Press.  
Ashbrook, William  (1998), "Donizetti, Gaetano" in Stanley Sadie  (Ed.),  The New Grove Dictionary of Opera, Vol. One. London: Macmillan Publishers, Inc.   
Ashbrook, William and Sarah Hibberd (2001), in  Holden, Amanda (Ed.), The New Penguin Opera Guide, New York: Penguin Putnam. .  pp. 224 – 247.
Black, John (1982), Donizetti’s Operas in Naples, 1822—1848. London: The Donizetti Society.
Loewenberg, Alfred (1970). Annals of Opera, 1597-1940, 2nd edition.  Rowman and Littlefield
Osborne, Charles, (1994),  The Bel Canto Operas of Rossini, Donizetti, and Bellini,  Portland, Oregon: Amadeus Press. 
Sadie, Stanley, (Ed.); John Tyrell (Exec. Ed.) (2004), The New Grove Dictionary of Music and Musicians.  2nd edition. London: Macmillan.    (hardcover).   (eBook).
 Weinstock, Herbert (1963), Donizetti and the World of Opera in Italy, Paris, and Vienna in the First Half of the Nineteenth Century, New York: Pantheon Books.

External links
 Donizetti Society (London) website
 Libretto (Italian)

Italian-language operas
Operas by Gaetano Donizetti
Operas
1844 operas
Opera world premieres at the Teatro San Carlo
Cultural depictions of Italian women